The Kaiser roll (Emperor roll), also called a Vienna roll (as made by hand also:),  or a hard roll, is a typically crusty round bread roll, originally from Austria. It is made from white flour, yeast, malt, water and salt, with the top side usually divided in a symmetric pattern of five segments, separated by curved superficial cuts radiating from the centre outward or folded in a series of overlapping lobes resembling a crown. The crisp  is a traditional Austrian food officially approved by the Federal Ministry of Agriculture.

Origin

Kaiser rolls have existed in a recognizable form since at least 1760. They are thought to have been named to honor Emperor Franz Joseph I of Austria (born 1830, reigned 1848–1916). Allegedly, the name  came into general use after the bakers' guild sent a delegation in 1789 to Emperor Joseph II ( 1741,  1765–1790) and convinced him to deregulate the price of bread rolls.

They are traditionally found in Austria, but have also become popular in other countries of the former Austrian Habsburg Empire, such as the Galicia region in Poland and later the whole country (where it is known as ), Croatia, Slovenia, and Serbia, Hungary, the Czech Republic (císařská žemle, císařská houska, kaiserka) and Slovakia, as well as in Germany, the United States, and Canada.

Variations
A handmade Kaiser roll is known as a  according to the  standards collection.

There are multiple variants of the common roll, differing in size, type of flour used, and toppings. While traditionally plain, Kaiser-style rolls are today found topped with poppy seeds, sesame seeds, pumpkin seeds, flax, or sunflower seeds. The Kaiser roll is a main part of a typical Austrian breakfast, usually served with butter and jam. A variation called a kümmelweck (alternatively spelled "kimmelweck" or "kummelweck") is topped with kosher salt and caraway, and in the United States is an essential component of a Buffalo-area specialty, the beef on weck sandwich.

In much of eastern New York State — New York City, Long Island, the Hudson Valley and the Adirondacks — and throughout New Jersey and Connecticut, Kaiser rolls are known as "hard rolls" or, rolls, and are staples of delicatessen and convenience stores. 

The Wisconsin variety of "hard roll", which was formed over the decades by the bakeries of Sheboygan to be paired with the local specialty of bratwurst (either in a long single bun or circular "double brat" roll), features a fluffy consistency on the inside with a crust on the crown of the bun, though most of the steps and some ingredients in the creation of Sheboygan hard rolls are proprietary, and can vary by each bakery's own recipe.

See also
 Austrian cuisine
 Central European cuisine
 List of bread rolls
 Vienna bread

References

External links
New York Folklore Society – Buffalo's Other Claim to Fame

American breads
Austrian cuisine
German cuisine
Poppy seeds
Yeast breads
Cuisine of the Mid-Atlantic states